School Number 6 may refer to:

School Number 6 (Davenport, Iowa), listed on the National Register of Historic Places in Scott County, Iowa
Jotham W. Wakeman Public School Number 6, Jersey City, New Jersey
School No. 6, listed on the National Register of Historic Places in Livingston County, New York
Park County School District Number 6, based in Cody, Wyoming
Uinta County School District Number 6, based in Lyman, Wyoming
Fremont County School District Number 6, based in Pavillion, Wyoming